Ladies & Gentlemen: The Best of George Michael is a greatest hits album by George Michael, released on 9 November 1998. The collection of 29 songs (28 on the North American release) is separated into two-halves, with each CD of the double set containing music of a particular theme and mood. The first CD, titled "For the Heart", predominantly contains Michael's hit ballads, while the second CD, "For the Feet", comprises mostly his popular dance tunes. A DVD release also titled Ladies & Gentlemen: The Best of George Michael followed in 1999, featuring 23 music videos from Michael's career.

After his death in December 2016, it was revealed by Michael's friend Geri Halliwell on The One Show that all of the British profits from the album went to the charity Terrence Higgins Trust.

Background and production
Ladies & Gentlemen is notable for containing a large number of compilation tracks and duets that have not previously appeared on a George Michael album, including his US and UK number-one duet with Aretha Franklin, "I Knew You Were Waiting (For Me)", previously available on Franklin's 1986 album Aretha; "Desafinado", the duet in Portuguese with Brazilian singer Astrud Gilberto; and the Elton John duet "Don't Let the Sun Go Down on Me", from John's 1993 album Duets. Most of the tracks are in their full, original album versions. "Careless Whisper" is the single version, "A Different Corner" was remixed for this compilation, "Fantasy" is the original 1990 version (not the "Fantasy 98" remix which appeared on the 'Outside' singles in the same period). "I Want Your Sex" is presented as "Part II – Brass in Love" only, without the more widely publicized "Part I – Lust" section  and "Monkey", which was included on the US and Japanese editions, is presented as the single version remixed by Jimmy Jam and Terry Lewis in the US edition.

Ladies & Gentlemen was released by Sony Music Entertainment as a condition of Michael severing his contractual ties with the label amid a great deal of acrimony and publicity prior to the release of Older in 1996. However, singles from Older do appear on this compilation. Michael would later return to Sony to release his 2004 album Patience.

Singles 
"Outside" was the first single from the album. The song was a humorous look at his arrest shortly before the release of the album for soliciting a policeman in a public restroom. "As", Michael's duet with Mary J. Blige, was released as the second single in many territories around the world. It reached number four on the UK Singles Chart. The track was left off the North American release of the album. There were rumours that Blige's label was uncomfortable with Michael being gay, but this is contradicted by Blige's embracing of her large gay fan base. Michael cited Blige's record company president for pulling the track after Michael's arrest for committing a lewd act.

Critical reception

The album received critical acclaim from music critics. Stephen Thomas Erlewine from AllMusic gave the album four and a half stars out of five and wrote that while "listening to both discs in a row is a little exhausting" the album "comes close to being definitive." Richard John from Jam! Showbiz gave the album 4 out of five stars and said that "over the course of Ladies & Gentlemen, you really get a feel for the growth and progress in Michael's musical output" and conclude that "for fans of George Michael or quality pop-soul-funk-dance" the album "is a worthy purchase". Alison Bellach from The Daily Vault gave the album an A− and wrote that "the collection is amazing" and that she was "pleased to note that the album included "Don't Let The Sun Go Down On Me", a duet with Elton John recorded for the Duets album", but she complained about "the version of "I Want Your Sex" that was chosen" because according to her "the original was something I could laugh at or snicker about" and the chosen version "doesn't even afford the listener a standard melody."

Commercial performance
It remained on the chart for 119 weeks. It was certified 9× Platinum by the BPI on 11 January 2019 denoting shipments of 2.7 million units. In 2017 alone, it was on the chart for 23 weeks.

It was certified 2× Platinum by the RIAA on 5 October 2000 for shipments of 2 million units. As of October 2006, the album had sold 1.1 million copies according to Nielsen SoundScan.

Track listing

Charts

Weekly charts

Year-end charts

Certifications and sales

See also
Ladies & Gentlemen: The Songs of George Michael, an album by Anthony Callea.

References

1998 greatest hits albums
George Michael albums
Epic Records compilation albums